Mazwi Tisani is a South African Anglican bishop: he was the inaugural Bishop of Ukhahlamba serving from 2009 to 2017.

Notes

21st-century Anglican Church of Southern Africa bishops
Anglican bishops of Ukhahlamba
Living people
Year of birth missing (living people)